Diarmaid Blake is a Gaelic footballer from Galway. Blake plays his club football with Milltown and was a former member of the Galway senior team.

Blake came to prominence as a student for St. Jarlath’s College of Tuam, playing in two Hogan Cup finals, however, appearing on the losing side both times in 1999 and 2001. He captured his All-Ireland winner’s medal as a part of the Galway 2002 All-Ireland Under-21 Football Championship winning team.

Blake’s senior career with Galway took off as he started at centre back in four consecutive Connacht finals between 2006 and 2009 and a National Football League final against Kerry in 2006. He was also nominated for an All Star Award during this period.

Honours
 St. Jarlath’s College
Connacht Colleges Senior Football Championship : (3) 1999, 2000, 2001
 Galway
Connacht Under-21 Football Championship : (1) 2002
Runner-up : (1) 2003
All-Ireland Under-21 Football Championship : (1) 2002
Connacht Senior Football Championship : (4) 2002, 2003, 2005, 2008
Runner-up : (3) 2006, 2007, 2009

References

Galway inter-county Gaelic footballers
Living people
Year of birth missing (living people)
Milltown Gaelic footballers